Øystein Baadsvik (born 14 August 1966) is a Norwegian tuba soloist and chamber musician.

Born in Trondheim, Norway, he began playing the tuba at the age of fifteen at his school in Trondheim, Norway, and won first prize at eighteen in a Norwegian national competition for soloists.  
His concert engagements include performances with orchestras such as the Oslo Philharmonic Orchestra, Bergen Philharmonic, Warsaw Philharmonic Orchestra, the Taipei National Symphony Orchestra, Singapore Philharmonic and Melbourne Symphony Orchestra. 2006 he made his New York recital debut at Carnegie Hall.
He studied under the tuba player Harvey Phillips and with Arnold Jacobs.  Øystein Baadsvik’s international career began in 1991 when he was awarded two prizes at Concours International d’Exécution Musicale in Geneva.

Øystein Baadsvik is  known for his master classes, performances, and tuba clinics which are frequently held in numerous universities throughout the world including The Juilliard School, Indiana University, Cleveland Institute of Music, Northwestern University, Shepherd School of Music at Rice University, the University of Wisconsin–Madison, Texas Christian University, The Royal College of Music Eastern Connecticut State University, Old Dominion University, and the University of Kentucky.   In addition, every October, a tour of various colleges and universities occurs, coinciding with Octubafest, a yearly celebration of tuba music.

Fnugg 

One of Baadsvik's most well-known works is Fnugg (Norwegian for something small, like a snowflake). Fnugg was originally written for solo Tuba and features a variety of unique performance skills, including "lip beats" and multiphonics.  It was later modified, with a major addition for either brass band or concert band and was titled Fnugg Blue.  His YouTube performance of Fnugg Blue was very theatrical in nature, with dancing and clapping from the audience.

CDs
Tuba Works – 1992 (Simax)
Tuba Carnival – 2003 (BIS)
Danzas – 2006 (BIS)
Kalevi Aho tuba concerto – 2007 (BIS)
Prelude, Fnugg, and Riffs – 2007 (BIS)
20th Century Tuba Concertos – 2008 (BIS)
21st Century Tuba Concertos – 2009 (BIS)
Ferry Tales – 2010 (BIS)
Snowflakes – 2011 (BIS)
Chameleon – 2012 (BIS)
Øystein Baadsvik plays Tuba Concertos - 2014 (BIS)
Journey - 2018 (BIS)

References

Norwegian classical tubists
Living people
1966 births
21st-century tubists
Musicians from Trondheim